Major General Phạm Văn Phú (1927, Hà Đông, French Indochina – 30 April 1975, Saigon, South Vietnam) was an officer in the Army of the Republic of Vietnam. He was a graduate of the 8th class of the Dalat Military Academy in 1954.

Military service
Phu was a company commanding officer in the 5th Battalion of Vietnamese Paratroopers (5th BPVN, standing for Bataillon de Parachutistes Vietnamiens in French) of the Vietnam National Army during the battle of Dien Bien Phu. He was captured with the remainder of the French garrison when it surrendered to the Viet Minh on 7 May 1954.

In the Army of the Republic of Vietnam (ARVN), Pham served as Chief of Staff of the Special Forces, commander of the 1st Division.

In an interview with The New York Times in early February 1972 he and 3rd Infantry Division commander General Vũ Văn Giai expressed doubts about the widely anticipated PAVN offensive in the northern provinces in mid-February stating that no major action would take place until March at the earliest due to the need for the PAVN to build up their logistics.

He served as director Quang Trung Training Center, before taking the command in 1974 of the II Corps/Military Region II in Pleiku. 

He was the commander during the Battle of Ban Me Thuot which was part of North Vietnam's Campaign 275 to capture the Central Highlands following the victory at Phước Long on 6 January 1975. His troops suffered heavy losses on the way of withdrawal to the coastal areas in April 1975. He committed suicide in Saigon on 30 April 1975, the day of the fall of Saigon when the Republic of Vietnam fell to the forces of the North Vietnamese Army.

References

Davidson, Phillip (1988). Vietnam at War: The History 1946-1975. Novato, CA: Presidio Press.

External links
 The Twenty-five Year Century

1927 births
1975 deaths
Army of the Republic of Vietnam generals
Vietnamese military personnel
South Vietnamese military personnel of the Vietnam War
Vietnamese people of the Vietnam War
Deaths by firearm in Vietnam
Date of birth missing
Suicides in Vietnam